Cindu may refer to:

Chemische Industrie Uithoorn, (CINDU), Dutch chemical company
One of the divisions of Tamil music dealt with in the Pancha Marapu